Nino Muñoz is a Chilean-Canadian photographer.

In 1999, Muñoz received his first professional assignment, shooting a fashion story for British Vogue with Gisele Bündchen.  Muñoz has continued to work with Bündchen throughout his career and has photographed some of Hollywood's actors and actresses such as, Tom Cruise, Hilary Swank, Leonardo DiCaprio, Julianne Moore, Don Cheadle, Adrien Brody, Maggie Gyllenhaal, Sam Rockwell, Jay-Z, Christina Aguilera, Beyoncé, Daniel Craig, and Jake Gyllenhaal.

He is an advertising photographer, with clients such as Bruno Magli, Lexus, Dune, Colcci, Rosa Cha, Misha, Falabella, Victoria's Secret, True Religion, Vero Moda, and London Fog. Nino has also worked with major TV & Entertainment networks including HBO, The CW, BBC America, NBC, Fox, CBS, Warner Bros., and Space.

Muñoz volunteered his time to the non-profit organization, the Art of Elysium, and in 2007, he collaborated with Art of Elysium and French Connection to host an exhibit of his photos, the proceeds of which benefited the Art of Elysium.

In 2008, Muñoz and Bündchen collaborated to celebrate the 30th anniversary of American Photo magazine.

A selection of Muñoz's photographs were on display in the "Beauty CULTure" exhibit at the Annenberg Space for photography in Los Angeles in 2012.

Notes

References

Chilean emigrants to Canada
Fashion photographers
Canadian portrait photographers
Chilean photographers
Living people
Year of birth missing (living people)